Crouania is a genus of red algae (Rhodophyta) in the Callithamniaceae family. 
The name of the genus honours the French born Crouan brothers, Pierre-Louis Crouan (1798 - 1871) and Hippolyte-Marie Crouan (1802 - 1871). 
It was first described by Jacob Georg Agardh in 1842, and the type species is Crouania attenuata.

Species list
According to WoRMS:
 Crouania attenuata (C.Agardh) J.Agardh (type species)
 Crouania boergesenii B.Subramanian
 Crouania brunyana Wollaston
 Crouania capricornica Saenger & Wollaston
Crouania dampieriana Huisman, 2018
 Crouania destriana Wollaston
 Crouania eliseae C.W.Schneider
 Crouania francescoi Cormaci, G.Furnari & Scammacca
 Crouania ischiana (Funk) C.F.Boudouresque & M.M.Perret-Boudouresque
 Crouania iyengarii B.Subramanian
 Crouania mageshimensis Itono
 Crouania mayae Mateo-Cid, Mendoza-González & Searles
 Crouania mucosa Wollaston
 Crouania pleonospora W.R.Taylor
Crouania pumila B.Gavio, V.P.Reyes-Gómez & M.J.Wynne, 2013
 Crouania robbii Wollaston
 Crouania shepleyana Wollaston
 Crouania willae R.E.Norris

According to Interim Register of Marine and Nonmarine Genera:
 Crouania attenuata (C.Agardh) J.Agardh, 1842
 Crouania boergesenii B.Subramanian, 1985
 Crouania brunyana Wollaston, 1998
 Crouania capricornica Saenger & Wollaston, 1982
 Crouania destriana Wollaston, 1968
Crouania divaricata Okamura, 1902
 Crouania elisiae C.W.Schneider, 2004
 Crouania francescoi Cormaci, G.Furnari & Scammacca, 1978
 Crouania ischiana (Funk) C.F.Boudouresque & M.M.Perret-Boudouresque, 1987
 Crouania iyengarii B.Subramanian, 1985
 Crouania mageshimensis Itono, 1977
 Crouania mayae Mateo-Cid, Mendoza-González & Searles, 2002
Crouania minutissima Yamada, 1944
 Crouania mucosa Wollaston, 1968
 Crouania pleonospora W.R.Taylor, 1928
 Crouania robbii Wollaston, 1998
 Crouania shepleyana Wollaston, 1968
 Crouania willae R.E.Norris, 1986

References

External links

Systềme canadien d'information sur la biodiversitẻ: Crouania

Ceramiales
Red algae genera